Surattha nigrifascialis is a moth in the family Crambidae. It is found in India.

References

Ancylolomiini
Moths described in 1866
Moths of Asia